Roland Sletor Morris (March 11, 1874 – November 23, 1945) was a U.S. diplomat and politician. He was the American ambassador to Japan from 1917 to 1920.

On September 20, 1917, a special dinner event was held to honor Morris in new position as U.S. Ambassador to Japan. This event was attended by six hundred guests, including most members of Philadelphia judiciary and other active civic members of the city. The speakers at this diplomatic gathering  included: Thomas B. Smith Mayor of Philadelphia, Aimaro Satō Japanese Ambassador to the U.S.,  Frank Lyon Polk (Counselor for the U.S. Department of State), Alexander Mitchell Palmer (soon to be U.S. Attorney General), Robert von Moschzisker (Justice of the Supreme Court of Pennsylvania from 1909 to 1921 and Chief Justice from 1921 to 1930), William Potter. Other prominent guests included U.S. Senator Boies Penrose and U.S. Senator Philander Chase Knox. The event took place at the Bellevue-Stratford Hotel, in Philadelphia.

He collaborated with Thomas Garrigue Masaryk during World War I in a question about the Czechoslovak Legions. In 1934, he lost the Pennsylvania Democratic U.S. Senate primary to Joseph Guffey, who was subsequently elected.

He was one of the founding partners of the law firm of Duane Morris, in Philadelphia.

He and his wife Augusta Twiggs Shippen West Morris, relative of both Levi Twiggs and Edward Shippen, are buried at Laurel Hill Cemetery in Philadelphia.

References

External links

Roland S. Morris Papers at Seeley G. Mudd Library, Princeton University

1874 births
1945 deaths
Ambassadors of the United States to Japan
Pennsylvania Democrats
20th-century American diplomats